Palembang is the capital city of the Indonesian province of South Sumatra.

Palembang may also refer to:
Palembang language, also known as Palembang Malay or Musi, a Malayic language primarily spoken in South Sumatra
Palembang people, a sub-ethnic group of Malays that inhabit the interior parts of South Sumatra
Palembang Sultanate, a princely state of Indonesia the southern part of the Indonesian island of Sumatra
Palembang LRT, light rail transit system of Indonesia

See also
Palimbang, a municipality in the province of Sultan Kudarat in the Philippines